Danielle Mullins is an American stylist and makeup artist who is best known as Miss Earth USA 2023.

Biography

Early life and education
Mullins is a Lexington native who graduated from Eastern Kentucky University with a degree in public relations.

Pageantry

Miss Earth USA 2023
Mullins competed against 50 other state titleholders to become the next Miss Earth USA. At the end of the event, she was hailed as the winner.

Mullins was crowned Miss Earth USA 2023 on January 7, 2023 by Miss Earth USA 2022, Brielle Simmons from Connecticut during the competition that was held at the Orange County Convention Center's Linda Chapin Theater in Orlando, Florida.

Miss Earth 2023
Mullins is expected to represent the United States at Miss Earth 2023 to be held on November 2023 in Vietnam.

References

Living people
1990s births
American beauty pageant winners
American make-up artists
People from Lexington, Kentucky
Year of birth missing (living people)